Pietroasa ("stony" in Romanian) is a commune in Bihor County, Crișana, Romania with a population of 3,209 people. It is composed of seven villages: Chișcău (Kiskoh), Cociuba Mică (Felsőkocsoba), Giulești (Zsulest), Gurani (Gurány), Măgura (Biharmagura), Moțești (Mocsest) and Pietroasa.

Bear Cave, a sightseeing location in the western Apuseni Mountains where 140 cave bear skeletons were found, is on the outskirts of Chișcău village.

References

External links 
 Oradea University: Peștera Urșilor 

Pietroasa
Localities in Crișana